Briareum violaceum, commonly called star polyp, is a species of a soft coral in the family Briareidae.

See also 
 Phyllodesmium briareum

References

Briareidae
Corals described in 1833